Edwin Greenslade Murphy (also known as Dryblower Murphy or simply Dryblower; 12 December 1866 – 9 March 1939) was an Australian journalist and poet.

Early life
Murphy was born in Castlemaine, Victoria, Australia, the tenth child and eldest son of Irish-born Edwin Murphy (plasterer and clay modeller), and his English wife Ellen, née Greenslade. He was educated at a state school at South Melbourne and began employment with his father at an early age. Murphy developed a good tenor voice, and joined the J. C. Williamson Opera Company, sang in the chorus and toured with it for two or three years. Following the gold rush of 1892 Murphy went to Western Australia, arriving in Coolgardie in 1894 after walking from Perth, Western Australia. There he did some dry blowing at Fly Flat and participated in sing-songs around pianos in local public bars.

Goldfields
The Coolgardie Miner was launched by Billy Clare with help from Murphy, who contributed a weekly gossip column using the pen-name "Dryblower", a name which Murphy used for the rest of his life. Murphy travelled north-east of Coolgardie to I.O.U (Bulong) and with two fellow prospectors, found a rich source of gold. With one of the other prospectors, Murphy travelled to London to float the 'Esmerelda' goldmine, but it slumped and he returned home. Soon afterwards he returned to England, writing for financial and social papers; he also helped to expose the hoaxer Louis de Rougemont before conducting him on a lecture tour. Murphy also enjoyed the London Gilbert and Sullivan operas, in which he sometimes sang.

For a short time the Sporting Life: Dryblower's journal was associated with Dryblower.
 
While on the Goldfields Murphy had begun writing verse for the press and about 1900 joined the staff of the Perth Sunday Times, to which he contributed a column entitled "Verse and Worse" for almost 40 years. In 1904 Murphy published a novel, Sweet Boronia: A Story of Coolgardie, which was followed in 1908 by a selection of his verses, Jarrahland Jingles.

Move to Perth
In 1910 he settled in Perth, Western Australia and continued to write for the Sunday Times and also did public readings of his poetry. A further selection of poetry, Dryblowers Verses, was published in 1924.

Death
Murphy died at Perth after an illness of some months on 9 March 1939. He was survived by his wife and three sons.

Legacy
Murphy wrote a large amount of verse which he probably made little attempt to revise. It was inevitable that many of his poems should be little more than jingles, as is suggested in the title of his first volume. At his best, Murphy was a good popular poet, and the verses he wrote when his son enlisted during World War I, "My Son", succeed in expressing the mingled pride and anguish of the occasion, where a finer poet might have failed. Privately, Murphy was a born joker and a great teller of stories. In his newspaper column he fought for many a popular cause, and his humour and kindly satire made him the best-known and best-loved journalist of his time in Western Australia.

Murphy is credited with only a fraction of the poems he wrote, for once he was established at the Perth "Sunday Times" (around 1902), he didn't put his name on his work in any of his several columns  (his main one being "Verse and Worse") in the Sunday Times or in his column "A Mingled Yarn" in the Kalgoorlie "Sun".  AustLit list only 191 of his poems (almost none from the "Sunday Times"), however we can make an estimate of his very prolific pen for each week he typically had 5 new poems (plus several short ditties), and, as his career spanned almost 40 years, this equates to a maximum of somewhere around 10,000 poems.

In addition to his main column in the Sunday Times,  between 1902 and 1904 he produced a series of short 3 verse limerick style caricatures of various personalities in Perth and on the Goldfields.  These were illustrated firstly by Fred Roofy and later Dick Hartley, resident artists with Sunday Times.  These went under the heading "Pictorial Posters" or "Familiar on the Fields", in all there are over 300 of them.  Once again, after identifying himself as the author in the first few, he did not do this for the remainder.

Notes

References
 Bennett, Arthur L. (1986) 'Murphy, Edwin Greenslade (1866–1939)', Australian Dictionary of Biography, Vol. 10, Melbourne University Press, 1986, pp 634–635. Retrieved 2009-10-26
 Bennett, Arthur L. (1982) Dryblower Murphy : his life and times Fremantle : Fremantle Arts Centre Press. 
 Bennett, A. (1988) Dryblower Murphy, i.e. Edwin Greenslade Murphy – reminisces about Murphy and his wit. Scoop (Perth, W.A), Vol. 2, no. 2 (June 1988), p. 21,
 Dryblower – in Quarterly review (Geraldton Historical Society), No. 56, May 1984, p. 9 – 11
 

1866 births
1939 deaths
Australian poets
Australian journalists
Australian newspaper editors
Australian prospectors
People from Coolgardie, Western Australia
Writers from Perth, Western Australia